Gigi Fernández and Natasha Zvereva were the two-time defending champions, and successfully defended their title, defeating Lindsay Davenport and Lisa Raymond in the final 6–2, 6–2.

Seeds
Champion seeds are indicated in bold text while text in italics indicates the round in which those seeds were eliminated.

Draw

Finals

Top half

Section 1

Section 2

Bottom half

Section 3

Section 4

External links
1994 French Open – Women's draws and results at the International Tennis Federation

Women's Doubles
French Open by year – Women's doubles
1994 in women's tennis
1994 in French women's sport